Kirklee railway station was a railway station serving the Kelvinside area in the West End of Glasgow, Scotland.

History
The station was opened on 10 August 1896 by the Glasgow Central Railway. Also known as Kirklee for North Kelvinside, it was closed between 1 January 1917 and 2 March 1919  2 June 1919  and closed permanently to passengers on 1 May 1939, with the line being closed on 5 October 1964.

The station building was designed by famous architect Sir J.J. Burnet who earned his knighthood on the basis of his design for the extension of the British Museum. The construction of the station was controversial in the 1890s as it destroyed a local beauty spot known as the Peartree Well. Little is known of the station's use after closure but a photo taken in 1959 appears to show it in use a private house. The station buildings were demolished in 1971 having fallen into disrepair.

The bulk of the station site is now occupied by blocks of apartments, however the platforms partially remain in place to the south, beyond the supports for a bridge which has since been removed, and just before a long tunnel leading to Botanic Gardens railway station. A telegraph pole dating from the line's operation is still present just before the mouth of the tunnel.

The station has been fenced in on both sides in 2017.

Footnotes

References
Anderson, Paul and Smith, W.A.C. (1993). Illustrated History of Glasgow's Railways. Irwell Press. .
Butt, R. V. J. (1995). The Directory of Railway Stations. Patrick Stephens Ltd, Sparkford. .
Morton, Henry B. (1973). 'A Hillhead Album'. Unknown publisher. . 
Urquhart, Gordon R. (2000). 'Along Great Western Road: An Illustrated History of Glasgow's West End'. Stenlake Publishing. .

External links

 RAILSCOT on the Glasgow Central Railway
 Video footage of the remnants of Kirklee for North Kelvinside Station.

Buildings and structures demolished in 1971
Disused railway stations in Glasgow
Railway stations in Great Britain opened in 1896
Railway stations in Great Britain closed in 1917
Railway stations in Great Britain opened in 1919
Railway stations in Great Britain closed in 1939
Former Caledonian Railway stations